The 1988 Brisbane Broncos season was the first in the club's history. The new venture team was added, along with the Newcastle Knights and Gold Coast-Tweed Giants to the New South Wales Rugby League's 1988 Winfield Cup premiership, coached by previous season grand final co-coach Wayne Bennett and captained by Australian national skipper Wally Lewis. Despite a strong start to the season, Brisbane failed to make the finals. During the season the Broncos also competed in the 1988 Panasonic Cup.

Season summary 
The same year Brisbane hosted World Expo 88, the Brisbane Broncos joined the New South Wales Rugby League premiership, making their debut on 6 March at Lang Park in Brisbane. The brand-new club which featured many Queensland-based international and state representatives, defeated the 1987 Winfield Cup Premiers Manly-Warringah 44-10 in their first premiership game. Brett Le Man scored the Broncos' first ever try from the scraps of a Craig Grauf bomb.

Although the Broncos won their first six games in their inaugural season, a midseason slump cost the club a debut finals appearance, finishing the season in seventh position. The Broncos also competed in the mid-week knockout competition, the 1988 Panasonic Cup, losing in the first round while they were still yet to lose a Winfield Cup match.

Match results 

 Game following a State of Origin match

Ladder

Awards

League 
nil

Club 
 Player of the year: Allan Langer
 Rookie of the year: Shane Duffy / Kerrod Walters
 Forward of the year: Terry Matterson
 Back of the year: Wally Lewis
 Clubman of the year: Greg Conescu

References

External links 
 Rugby League Tables and Statistics

Brisbane Broncos seasons
Brisbane Broncos season
Brisbane Broncos season